Complex is an alternative hip hop compilation album released on Lex Records on 21 April 2012. It compiled the ten tracks that Lex had released digitally to mark its tenth anniversary.

Recording
"Retarded Fren" by MF Doom remixed by Thom Yorke samples Jonny Greenwood's "Proven Lands" from score for There Will Be Blood.

"Wheels" by Neon Neon, was recorded during the Stainless Style studio sessions and completed for the Complex and continues Stainless Style's theme of a fictional biography of John Delorean.

Track listing
 Jel - "Last Decade" (3:17)
 Neon Neon - "Wheels" (4:07)
 JJ Doom - "Rhymin Slang (Dave Sitek Remix)" (2:37)
 Boom Bip - "Clocked" (4:08)
 Xeno & Oaklander - "Sets & Lights" (4:47)
 Stalactite - "Lava Tube" (4:18)
 MF Doom with Thom Yorke & Jonny Greenwood - "Retarded Fren" (3:17)
 Danger Mouse & Jemini the Gifted One - "Knuckle Sandwich II" (1:29)
 Dr. Who Dat? - "Viberian Twilight Part 2" (2:56)
 Crook & Flail - "Freelance Exist" (3:29)

References

External links
 

2012 albums
Alternative hip hop compilation albums
Lex Records albums